Shrewsbury Church is a historic Episcopal church located at Kennedyville, Kent County, Maryland, United States. It is a rural parish church constructed in 1834, and remodeled to its present vernacular Gothic-influenced appearance in 1890. The church is constructed of brick and features a three-stage buttressed and crenelated tower at the entrance, a low one-story chancel, and Gothic influenced walnut furnishings. South Sassafras Parish, as it was originally known, was one of the original 30 Anglican parishes in the Province of Maryland. Buried in the churchyard is John Cadwalader, a general of the American Revolutionary War.

Shrewsbury Church was listed on the National Register of Historic Places in 1986.

References

External links
, including photo from 1977, at Maryland Historical Trust
Shrewsbury Parish Church website

Episcopal church buildings in Maryland
Churches in Kent County, Maryland
Churches on the National Register of Historic Places in Maryland
Churches completed in 1834
19th-century Episcopal church buildings
Gothic Revival church buildings in Maryland
National Register of Historic Places in Kent County, Maryland